Nga Yiu Ha is a village in Ta Kwu Ling, North District, Hong Kong.

See also
 Heung Yuen Wai Highway

External links
 Delineation of area of existing village Nga Yiu Ha (Ta Kwu Ling) for election of resident representative (2019 to 2022)

Villages in North District, Hong Kong